Daniel Joseph Meagher (born 10 November 1961) is an Australian Catholic bishop. He has served as an Auxiliary Bishop of the Roman Catholic Archdiocese of Sydney since 2021. Previously parish priest of All Hallows’ Parish in Five Dock, his episcopal consecration took place on 8 December 2021.

Early life 
Meagher was born in West Wyalong, New South Wales, on 10 November 1961 to Alan and Elizabeth Meagher. He was educated at Saint Ignatius' College, Riverview and studied economics and law at the University of Sydney.

Priesthood 
Meagher was ordinated a priest at St Mary's Cathedral, Sydney on 22 July 1995. He served as the founding Parish Priest at Holy Spirit Parish in Carnes Hill from 2000 to 2004. He then studied for two years at the Gregorian Pontifical University in Rome, obtaining a Licentiate in Fundamental Theology. From 2012 to 2014, he served as the administrator at the Sacred Heart Cathedral in Broken Hill, New South Wales, within the Diocese of Wilcannia–Forbes.

In 2015, Meagher returned to Sydney and served as Rector of the Seminary of the Good Shepherd until 2020 and in 2021, he served as the Administrator of All Hallows in Five Dock.

Episcopate
Meagher was appointed Auxiliary Bishop of Sydney by Pope Francis on 18 November 2021 and was given the titular see of Pocofelto in Tunisia. He was consecrated by Archbishop Anthony Fisher on 8 December 2021 in St Mary's Cathedral, Sydney.

References 

Living people
1961 births
Australian bishops
Roman Catholic bishops of Sydney
Clergy from New South Wales
University of Sydney alumni
Pontifical Gregorian University alumni
21st-century Roman Catholic bishops in Australia